NGC 4203 is the New General Catalogue identifier for a lenticular galaxy in the northern constellation of Coma Berenices. It was discovered on March 20, 1787 by English astronomer William Herschel, and is situated 5.5° to the northwest of the 4th magnitude star Gamma Comae Berenices and can be viewed with a small telescope. The morphological classification of NGC 4203 is SAB0−, indicating that it has a lenticular form with tightly wound spiral arms and a weak bar structure at the nucleus.

This galaxy has a fairly large reservoir of neutral hydrogen containing on the order of a billion solar masses, but it is only undergoing a low rate of new star formation. Hence, the inner star formation of the galaxy is fairly old; roughly ten billion years on average. The neutral hydrogen is arranged in two ring-like structures, with the outer ring having nine times the mass of the inner. In the central region there is around   of molecular hydrogen, plus dust structures within  of the nucleus. The gas in the outer disk may have been accreted from the inter-galactic medium, or captured during a close encounter with a dwarf galaxy.

The nucleus of the galaxy contains a low-ionization nuclear emission-line region of type 1.9. This is being generated by a supermassive black hole of an estimated  . An influx of gas of around  /yr is sufficient to explain the measured X-ray luminosity. The time-varying emissions from the region are perhaps best explained by an infalling asymptotic giant branch star that is losing mass to the black hole along a contrail.

NGC 4203 is a member of the Coma I Group which is part of the Virgo Supercluster.

References

External links

Lenticular galaxies
Coma Berenices
4203
07256
Coma I Group
039158